Nicolas Fabiano (born 8 February 1981) is a French former professional footballer who played as a midfielder.

Career
Fabiano was born in Courbevoie, Hauts-de-Seine.

In 2002, he played top division football in the Scottish Premier League and UEFA Cup for Aberdeen.

He was without a club for one year, and then joined RCF Paris of Championnat National and left the club after they were relegated to CFA 2.

He was also included in the French U20 squad for the 2001 FIFA World Youth Championship.

External links
 
 
 

1981 births
Living people
People from Courbevoie
French footballers
France youth international footballers
Paris Saint-Germain F.C. players
Swansea City A.F.C. players
FC Istres players
Aberdeen F.C. players
Racing Club de France Football players
Red Star F.C. players
Association football midfielders
Ligue 2 players
Scottish Premier League players
Expatriate footballers in Wales
Expatriate footballers in Scotland
French expatriate footballers
Footballers from Hauts-de-Seine